"Looking Out for Number One" is a song co-written and recorded by American country music artist Travis Tritt. It was released in July 1993 as the fourth single from the album T-R-O-U-B-L-E.  The song reached number 11 on the Billboard Hot Country Singles & Tracks chart.  The song was written by Tritt and Troy Seals.

Critical reception
Deborah Evans Price, of Billboard magazine reviewed the song favorably, saying that Tritt "maintains his uncanny sense of balance between country and southern rock in this ode to self-preservation." She says that the song contains "ripping guitar and growling blues harp way up front." She goes on to say that Tritt's "pinched-from-the-throat vocals manage to keep things reassuringly country."

Chart performance

Year-end charts

References

1993 singles
1992 songs
Travis Tritt songs
Songs written by Troy Seals
Songs written by Travis Tritt
Warner Records singles